Apis mellifera sahariensis is a North African bee subspecies of the species Apis mellifera. It is closely related to Apis mellifera intermissa in the region.

Apis mellifera sahariensis is native to Sahara desert oasis habitats. This bee type adapted to the date palm (Phoenix dactylifera) and other Saharan flora.

See also
Subspecies of Apis mellifera

References 

mellifera sahariensis
Western honey bee breeds
Insects of Africa
Fauna of the Sahara
Insects of Egypt
Insects of Sudan